
Year 610 (DCX) was a common year starting on Thursday (link will display the full calendar) of the Julian calendar, the 610th year of the Common Era (CE) and Anno Domini (AD) designations, the 610th year of the 1st millennium, the 10th year of the 7th century, and the 1st year of the 610s decade. The denomination 610 for this year has been used since the early medieval period, when the Anno Domini calendar era became the prevalent method in Europe for naming years.

Events 
 By place 
 Byzantine Empire 
 October 4 – Heraclian revolt: Heraclius arrives with a fleet from Africa at Constantinople. Assisted by an uprising in the capital, he overthrows and personally beheads Emperor Phocas. Heraclius gains the throne with help from his father Heraclius the Elder. His first major act is to change the official language of the Eastern Roman Empire from Latin to Greek (already the language of the vast majority of the population). Because of this, after AD 610, the Empire is customarily referred to as the Byzantine Empire (the term Byzantine is a modern term invented by historians in the 18th century; the people of the Empire itself always referred to themselves as "Ρωμαῖος" — tr. Rōmaios, Roman).

 Europe 
 The Avars invade the Duchy of Friuli, an important buffer between the Kingdom of the Lombards in Italy and the Slavs. During the fighting Gisulf II dies and his duchy is overrun (approximate date).
 King Witteric is assassinated during a banquet at Toledo, by a faction of Catholic nobles. He is succeeded by Gundemar, duke of Narbonne, who becomes king of the Visigoths in Hispania.
 King Theuderic II loses Alsace, Champagne and Thurgau to his elder brother Theudebert II of Austrasia. His Burgundian army is defeated east of the Jura Mountains against the Alemanni.
 The Volga Bulgaria arises on the territory of modern Russia, being the first civilization in the region to arise from the Early Slavs (approximate date).

 Britain 
 Selyf ap Cynan succeeds his father Cynan Garwyn as king of Powys (Wales).

 By topic 
 Arts and sciences 
 Paper technology is imported into Japan from China by the Korean Buddhist priest, Dam Jing (approximate date).

 Religion 
 Muhammad, Islamic prophet, begins at 40 years old to preach a religion which will be called Islam. According to Islamic teachings, the angel Gabriel appears to him in a cave on Mount Hira near Mecca (Saudi Arabia) and calls him: "The Prophet of Allah". Muhammad gathers followers, reciting to them the first verses of Qur'an(Iqra), thus beginning the revelation of the Qur'an. 
 Pope Boniface IV presides over a Council of Rome for the restoration of monastic discipline. Attendees include Mellitus, first bishop of London.
 Columbanus and Gallus begin their missionary work in Bregenz, near Lake Constance (Switzerland).
 John V (the Merciful) becomes patriarch of Alexandria (approximate date).

Births 
 Anania Shirakatsi, Armenian astronomer (d. 685)
 Barbatus, bishop of Benevento (approximate date)
 Ergica, king of the Visigoths (approximate date)
 Grimoald, King of the Lombards (approximate date)
 Lai Ji, official of the Tang dynasty (d. 662)
 Nanthild, Frankish queen (approximate date)
 Safiyya bint Huyayy, wife of Muhammad (approximate date)

Deaths 
 October 5 – Phocas, Byzantine emperor 
 Gisulf II, Lombard duke of Friuli (approximate date)
 Heraclius the Elder, Byzantine general
 Tassilo I, King of Bavaria (b. 560)
 Waraka ibn Nawfal,  the paternal first cousin of Khadija, the first wife of the Islamic prophet Muhammad.
 Witteric, king of the Visigoths

References